Megha Dhade is an Indian actress. In 2018, she participated and became the winner of the first season of Bigg Boss Marathi 1 and later participated in Bigg Boss 12 as a wild card contestant.

Early life
She was born in a middle-class family in Jalgaon, Maharashtra.

Career
She has appeared in other Hindi TV serials including Kis Dhesh Mai Hai Mera Dil and Kasturi. She made her acting debut with a Marathi movie in 2012. She has also worked in the soap opera Pehchaan, which aired on DD National. In early 2018, she emerged as the winner of the reality show Bigg Boss Marathi In late October 2018, She joined another reality show Bigg Boss 12 as a wild card entry. She was evicted on 6 December.

Personal life
She's married to Aditya Pawaskar. She has two kids, daughter, Sakshi and a step son Vedant from her husband's first marriage.

Filmography

Television

See also

 Cinema of India
 Marathi movies

References

External links

21st-century Indian actresses
Indian film actresses
Living people
People from Jalgaon
Actresses in Marathi cinema
Indian television actresses
Indian soap opera actresses
Actresses in Hindi television
1988 births
Bigg Boss Marathi contestants
Bigg Boss (Hindi TV series) contestants
Big Brother (franchise) winners